Riverside High School was a public high school in Chattanooga, Tennessee, operating from 1963 - 1983. Its building currently houses the Chattanooga School for the Arts and Sciences - Upper School.

Notable alumni
 Samuel L. Jackson, actor and director
 Mike Jones, football, NFL wide receiver from 1983-89.
 Richard Fuqua, basketball, All-American at Oral Roberts University in Tulsa, Oklahoma, and fourth-round pick of the Boston Celtics in the 1973 NBA draft.
 Anthony Roberts, basketball, 1977 first-round pick of Denver Nuggets of the NBA. He played college basketball at Oral Roberts University in Tulsa, Oklahoma.

References

1983 disestablishments in Tennessee